Picked off could refer to:

Picked Off, an American television series on History
Pickoff, a baseball play to tag out a baserunner
A pass thrown for an interception in American and Canadian football